is a Japanese children's literature writer and lyricist. Her first work, Iyayaen, was published in 1962, and she has published over 30 books since then. She has won multiple awards for her works, including the Kikuchi Kan Prize.

She wrote the lyrics for the opening theme song for the 1988 Studio Ghibli film My Neighbor Totoro as well as to another song used in the film. She has written the lyrics for over 20 other songs, including "Yūki" sung by Mana Ashida for the 81st NHK All Japan School Singing Competition.

Personal life
 was born September 29, 1935, in Sapporo, Hokkaido, Japan. When she was four years old, her family moved in with her grandfather in Tokyo, where she lived until she was in the third year of grade school. Her family then moved back to Sapporo for a short time before being evacuated at the end of World War II. Her father was transferred to Fukushima, where she lived until moving back to Tokyo during her second year of high school. She graduated from the

Professional life
While working as a nursery school worker, she wrote .

The Society for the Promotion of Japanese Literature awarded the Kikuchi Kan Prize jointly with her younger sister Yuriko Yamawaki for their children's book series Guri and Gura.

Nakagawa has written a number of essays. She also wrote lyrics for multiple songs for the 1988 Studio Ghibli film My Neighbor Totoro, including Sanpo and Maigo. "Yūki" was the theme song for the 81st NHK All Japan School Singing Competition in the elementary school group.

Works

Children's books

Guri and Gura series
This series has been published since 1967 by Fukuinkan Shoten. All of the books are illustrated by Yuriko Yamawaki, though the first book is credited to Yuriko Ōmura (her maiden name). Several of these titles have been released in English, Korean, and other languages.
 Guri and Gura (1967)
 Guri and Gura's Surprise Visitor (1967)
 Guri and Gura's Seaside Adventure (1977, serialized in Kodomo no Tomo)
 Guri and Gura's Picnic Adventure (1983, serialized in Kodomo no Tomo)
 Guri and Gura's Magical Friend (1992, serialized in Kodomo no Tomo)
 Guri and Gura's Playtime Book of Seasons (1997)
 Guri and Gura's A-I-U-E-O (2002)
 Guri and Gura's Spring Cleaning (2002)
 Guri and Gura's Songs of the Seasons (2003)
 Guri and Gura's Special Gift (2003, serialized in Kodomo no Tomo)
 Guri and Gura's 1-2-3 (2004)
 Guri and Gura's Good Luck Charm (2009)

Other works
  (1962, Fukuinkan Shoten, illustrated by Yuriko Ōmura)
  (1964, Fukuinkan Shoten, illustrated by Yuriko Ōmura)
 Sora Iro no Tane (1964, Fukuinkan Shoten, illustrated by Yuriko Ōmura)
  (1965, Fukuinkan Shoten, illustrated by Sōya Nakagawa)
  (1969, Fukuinkan Shoten, illustrated by Yuriko Yamawaki)
  (1970, Fukuinkan Shoten, illustrated by Sōya Nakagawa)
  (1970, Fukuinkan Shoten, illustrated by Sōya Nakagawa)
  (1971, Fukuinkan Shoten, illustrated by Sōya Nakagawa)
  (1971, Mitsumura Tosho Shuppan, Japanese language manual for 1st year elementary students)
  (1971, Gakken, illustrated by Yuriko Yamawaki)
  (1972, Iwanami Shoten, illustrated by Sōya Nakagawa)
  (1971, Kodansha)
  (1975, Gakken, illustrated by Yuriko Yamawaki)
  (1977, Fukuinkan Shoten, illustrated by Yuriko Yamawaki)
  (1978, Fukuinkan Shoten, illustrated by Yuriko Yamawaki)
  (1979, Fukuinkan Shoten, illustrated by Sōya Nakagawa)
  (1982, Fukuinkan Shoten, illustrated by Sōya Nakagawa)
  (1986, Fukuinkan Shoten, illustrated by Yuriko Yamawaki)
  (1986, Nora Shoten, illustrated by Yuriko Yamawaki)
  (1986, Guranmamasha, illustrated by Yuriko Yamawaki)
  (1986, Guranmamasha, illustrated by Yuriko Yamawaki)
  (1986, Nora Shoten, illustrated by Yuriko Yamawaki)
  (1988, Fukuinkan Shoten, illustrated by Yuriko Yamawaki)
  (1991, Fukuinkan Shoten, illustrated by Yuriko Yamawaki)
  (1992, Nora Shoten, illustrated by Kakuta Nakagawa)
  (1993, Fukuinkan Shoten, illustrated by Sōya Nakagawa)
  (1994, Fukuinkan Shoten, illustrated by Yuriko Ōmura)
  (1995, Fukuinkan Shoten, illustrated by Yuriko Yamawaki)
  (1995, Fukuinkan Shoten, illustrated by Sōya Nakagawa)
  (1998, Fukuinkan Shoten, illustrated by Yuriko Yamawaki)
  (1998, Fukuinkan Shoten, illustrated by Sōya Nakagawa)
  (2001, Fukuinkan Shoten, illustrated by Yuriko Yamawaki)
  (2001, Child Honsha, illustrated by Kōzō Kakimoto)
  (2006, Fukuinkan Shoten, illustrated by Yuriko Yamawaki, a selection of Kodomo no Tomo)
  (2006, Fukuinkan Shoten, illustrated by Yuriko Yamawaki, a best selection of Kodomo no Tomo)
  (2007, Nora Shoten, illustrated by Yuriko Yamawaki)
  (2008, Nora Shoten, illustrated by Yuriko Yamawaki)

Sources:

Essays
  (1982, Daiwa Shobō, illustrated by Yuriko Yamawaki)
  (1985, Froebel-kan, a conversation with Shirō Nakagawa)
  (1996, Fukuinkan Shoten)

Lyrics
  (composed by Hiroshi Hara)
  (composed by Neko Saito)
  (composed by Kōsuke Ōide)
  (composed by Hisako Furuichi)
  (composed by Yasuko Kurihara)
 "Kujiratori" (composed by Yuji Nomi)
  (composed by Rieko Nakamura)
  (composed by Masamichi Takahashi and Mieko Okumura)
  (composed by Kikuko Kobayashi and Hoick)
  (composed by Akihiro Komori, arranged by Akiko Yano, sung by Akiko Yano)
  (composed by Nobuyoshi Koshibe)
  (composed by Makoto Moroi and Michio Mado)
 My Neighbor Totoro (soundtrack and image albums):
  (composed and arranged by Joe Hisaishi)
  (composed and arranged by Joe Hisaishi)
  (composed and arranged by Joe Hisaishi)
  (composed and arranged by Joe Hisaishi)
  (composed and arranged by Joe Hisaishi)
  (composed and arranged by Joe Hisaishi)
  (composed by Hiroshi Aoshima)
  (with Michio Mado, composed by Joji Yuasa)
  (composed by Neko Saito)
  (composed by Nobuyoshi Koshibe)
  (composed by Haruna Miyake)
  (composed by Masabumi Kikuchi)
  (composed by Takatsugu Muramatsu)

Notes

References

1935 births
People from Sapporo
Writers from Hokkaido
Japanese lyricists
20th-century Japanese women writers
21st-century Japanese women writers
Living people
Japanese children's writers
Japanese women children's writers